Yardina Rock is a granite rock formation located approximately  north east of Norseman and approximately  south east of Kambalda in the Goldfields-Esperance region of Western Australia. 

See also
Granite outcrops of Western Australia

References

Goldfields-Esperance
Rock formations of Western Australia